Gene Dunlap (born June 19, 1954 in Detroit, Michigan), is an American jazz/soul/disco drummer and bandleader.

Life and work
Gene Dunlap was born and raised in Detroit, Michigan, and he began playing drums as a high school student. He joined the guitarist Earl Klugh as a drummer. In later years, he also performed with Roy Ayers, who played the vibraphone, and guitarist Grant Green.

Afterward, he rejoined Earl Klugh during the mid-1970s, to record a series of albums during a period of 20 years, including some albums for Capitol Records. After 1994, Dunlap quit performing and taught inner city youth in Detroit, but returned as a bandleader/drummer in April 2000.

Discography

Studio albums

Singles

References

External links
 Gene Dunlap at Discogs.
 The Gene Dunlap Band at Discogs.

Living people
American soul singers
Singers from Detroit
1954 births
21st-century African-American male singers
20th-century African-American male singers